Hayyim (Jefim) Schirmann (October 19, 1904 – June 14, 1981) was an Israeli scholar of medieval Spanish and Italian Jewish poetry.

Biography
Hayyim Schirmann was born in Kiev in the Russian Empire. He studied in his home country until 1919. His family then moved to Germany.  he received a degree in Semitic linguistics from Berlin University in 1930.

Academic career
Schirmann joined the Schocken Institute for Study of Medieval Hebrew Poetry in 1930, and emigrated to Mandate Palestine, now Israel, in 1934 when the Institute relocated there.

He began lecturing in medieval poetry at the Hebrew University of Jerusalem in 1942, and became a professor there in 1954. Schirmann continuing his work at the university until 1968. He died in Paris in 1981.

Schirmann was also a violinist. He published essays on music and drew parallels between music and Jewish literature in his literary works.

Awards and recognition
In 1957, Schirmann was awarded the Israel Prize, for Jewish studies.

Published works
 Die hebräische Übersetzung der Maqamen des Hariri (Schriften der Gesellschaft zur Förderung der Wissenschaft des Judentums 37). Frankfurt am Main: J. Kauffmann 1930.
 מבחר השירה העברית באיטליה [Anthology of Hebrew Poetry in Italy]. Berlin: Schocken 1934.
 השירה העברית בספרד ובפרובאנס [Hebrew Poetry of Spain and Provence]. 2 vols. Jerusalem 1954/56.
 תולדות השירה העברית בספרד המוסלמית [The History of Hebrew Poetry in Muslim Spain. Edited, Supplemented and Annotated by Ezra Fleischer.] Jerusalem: Magnes 1995.  
 תולדות השירה העברית בספרד הנוצרית ובדרום צרפת [The History of Hebrew Poetry in Christian Spain and Southern France. Edited, Supplemented and Annotated by Ezra Fleischer]. Jerusalem: Magnes 1997.

References

Bibliography

This article incorporates material from the article Chaim Schirmann in German Wikipedia.

Jewish historians
Humboldt University of Berlin alumni
Academic staff of the Hebrew University of Jerusalem
Israel Prize in Jewish studies recipients
Members of the Israel Academy of Sciences and Humanities
Ukrainian Jews
Writers from Kyiv
Jewish emigrants from Nazi Germany to Mandatory Palestine
1904 births
1981 deaths
Emigrants from the Russian Empire to Germany
20th-century  Israeli historians